Albert Delvaille, called Trébla  (Neuilly-sur-Seine, 30 May 1870 – Paris, October 1943) was a French playwright and novelist.

After he finished his studies at École Monge, he joined his father at Sète where he had his first play presented. He was then just 15. After he returned in Paris, his plays were given on numerous stages including the Théâtre Antoine, La Cigale or the Bataclan.

He is buried at the Montmartre Cemetery (3rd division).

Works 

 Le Médecin vétérinaire, vaudeville in 1 act, 1885
 Le Harem de Pontarlier, maraboulerie in 1 act, with Carin, music by Laurent Halet, 1897
 Elle !, drame réaliste in 1 act, with John Croisier, 1898
 Personne !, comedy in 1 act, 1899
 Un Amant de cœur, comédie-pantalonnade in 1 act, with Léon Garnier, 1900
 L'Amour en fantaisies, 1900
 Cornarville, one-act play, with Jean Lavaur, 1900
 Les Joyeux chauffeurs, ou le Jeu de l'auto, one-act play, with Carin, 1900
 Napoléglon, one-act play and 3 tableaux, with Blount, 1900
 Nostalgie, drama in 1 act, with Eugène Héros, 1900
 Une Actualité sensationnelle, comedy in 1 act, with Henry de Forge, 1900
 La Grève des couturières, vaudeville in 1 act, with Blount, 1901
 Claudine en vadrouille, play in 4 tableaux, music by Laurent Halet, 1902
 Cendrillette ou la culotte merveilleuse, play in 2 acts and 2 tableaux, with René Schwaeblé, 1903
 Le 68e Plongeurs à cheval, fantaisie-opérette in 2 acts, with Harry Blount, 1904
 Agitons nos gambettes, fantaisie in 1 act, 1904
 Mariage et photographie, vaudeville in 1 act, 1904
 Restaurant pour dames (Ladies' house), one-act play, with Edmond Char, 1904
 La Corde, one-act play, with Coquiot, 1905
 Maison Bonnard et Legrenay, drama in 1 act, 1905
 La Guêpe, comédie dramatique in 1 act, with Coquiot, 1906
 Les Treize jours de Laburette, one-act play in 1 act and 1 tableau, 1906
 La Belle et la bonne, vaudeville in 1 act, with Peter Carin, 1907
 Coco-Chéri, operetta in 2 acts and 4 tableaux, with Codey, music by François Perpignan, 1907
 Dans les vieux pots, comedy in 1 act, with Héros, 1907
 Vive la République !, one-act play, with Coquiot, 1907
 L'Ami de la justice, comedy in 1 act, with Gustave Coquiot, 1908
 Ali-Bébé ou les Quarante voleuses, operetta in 2 acts and 4 tableaux, with Émile Codey, music by Gustave Goublier, 1909
 La Petite Poison, with Codey, 1909
 Le Plus beau corps de France, military fantasy in 2 acts and 5 tableaux, with Codey, 1910
 Des Mots, des phrases, 1918
 Caille sur canapé, one-act play, with Marc Sonal, 1920
 Madame la vie, 1920
 Chez les Clapet, saynète, 1921
 Les Femmes des amis, c'est sacré ! ou le Cocu débonnaire, 1924
 Une Maison où l'on cause, one-act play, 1924
 J'veux pas rester vieille fille, novel, with Lyonel Robert, 1925
 Pactaquate, 1935
 2 de Marseille, with Sonal, 1937
 L'Héritière de Courmelon, one-act play, with Sonal, 1938
 Un Mouchoir à la fenêtre, sketch radiophonique, 1938
 Un Seul amour, comedy in 1 act, with Sonal, 1938

Bibliography 
 Isidore Singer, Cyrus Adler, The Jewish encyclopedia, a descriptive record of the history, religion, literature, and customs of the Jewish people from the earliest times to the present day, vol.4, 1925,

References 

19th-century French dramatists and playwrights
20th-century French dramatists and playwrights
20th-century French novelists
People from Neuilly-sur-Seine
1870 births
1943 deaths
Burials at Montmartre Cemetery